= Jorge Huirse =

Peruvian composer and pianist

Jorge Huirse (August 30, 1920 – December 11, 1992) was a Peruvian composer and pianist.

== Discography ==
Series	Title	House Label
LD 1437	Hace Tiempo	I.E.M.P.S.A
LD 1464	Reliquias del Perú	I.E.M.P.S.A
LD 1487	Hoy como Ayer	I.E.M.P.S.A
LD 1301	Machu Picchu / La Ciudad Perdida de los Incas.	I.E.M.P.S.A
LD 1311	Jorge Huirse y su Orquesta	I.E.M.P.S.A
VIR 977	Melodías del Perú Eterno	Virrey
LD	Sinfonía al Perú Vol.1	
LD	Sinfonía al Perú Vol.2	
